The 2003 Calder Cup playoffs of the American Hockey League began on April 9, 2003. Twenty teams, the top ten from each conference, qualified for the playoffs. The seventh-, eighth-, ninth-, and tenth-placed teams in each conference played best-of-three series in the qualifying round. The four winners, in addition to the other twelve teams that qualified, played best-of-five series for conference quarterfinals. The remaining 8 teams played best-of-seven series for conference semifinals and conference finals.  The conference champions played a best-of-seven series for the Calder Cup. The Calder Cup Final ended on June 12, 2003 with the Houston Aeros defeating the Hamilton Bulldogs four games to three to win the first Calder Cup in team history.

Houston's Johan Holmqvist won the Jack A. Butterfield Trophy as AHL playoff MVP and also set a record for most minutes played by a goaltender in a single playoff with 1498. Jarret Stoll of the Hamilton Bulldogs set an AHL playoff record for the fastest goal from the start of a period by scoring 4 seconds into the 3rd period on May 22, 2003 against Binghamton. Hamilton's Michael Ryder ended the longest game in AHL history when he scored at 14:56 of the fourth overtime in Game 2 of the Calder Cup Final. However, this record was eclipsed during the 2008 Calder Cup Playoffs.

Playoff seeds
After the 2002–03 AHL regular season, 20 teams qualified for the playoffs. The top ten teams from each conference qualified for the playoffs. The Hamilton Bulldogs were the Eastern Conference regular season champions as well as the Macgregor Kilpatrick Trophy winners with the best overall regular season record. The Grand Rapids Griffins were the Western Conference regular season champions. Division champions were automatically ranked 1-3.

Eastern Conference
Hamilton Bulldogs – Canadian Division and Eastern Conference regular season champions; Macgregor Kilpatrick Trophy winners, 110 points
Providence Bruins – North Division champions, 104 points
Binghamton Senators – East Division champions, 97 points
Manchester Monarchs – 97 points
Bridgeport Sound Tigers – 94 points
Worcester IceCats – 88 points
Hartford Wolf Pack – 86 points
Portland Pirates – 85 points
Manitoba Moose – 84 points
Springfield Falcons – 76 points

Western Conference
Grand Rapids Griffins – Central Division and Western Conference regular season champions, 106 points
Houston Aeros – West Division champions, 104 points
Norfolk Admirals – South Division champions, 91 points
Chicago Wolves – 98 points
Hershey Bears – 89 points
San Antonio Rampage – 87 points
Milwaukee Admirals – 85 points
Wilkes-Barre/Scranton Penguins – 84 points
Utah Grizzlies – 83 points
Rochester Americans – 81 points

Bracket

The top 6 teams in each conference receive byes to the Conference Quarterfinals. In each round, the highest remaining seed in each conference is matched against the lowest remaining seed. In the qualification round, all games are played at the arena of the higher seed. In each round the higher seed receives home ice advantage, meaning they receive the "extra" game on home-ice if the series reaches the maximum number of games. There is no set series format for each series after the Qualification Round due to arena scheduling conflicts and travel considerations.

Conference Qualifiers
Note 1: All times are in Eastern Time (UTC−4).
Note 2: Game times in italics signify games to be played only if necessary.
Note 3: Home team is listed first.

Eastern Conference

(7) Hartford Wolf Pack vs. (10) Springfield Falcons

(8) Portland Pirates vs. (9) Manitoba Moose

Western Conference

(7) Milwaukee Admirals vs. (10) Rochester Americans

(8) Wilkes-Barre/Scranton Penguins vs. (9) Utah Grizzlies

Conference Quarterfinals

Eastern Conference

(1) Hamilton Bulldogs vs. (10) Springfield Falcons

(2) Providence Bruins vs. (9) Manitoba Moose

(3) Binghamton Senators vs. (6) Worcester IceCats

(4) Manchester Monarchs vs. (5) Bridgeport Sound Tigers

Western Conference

(1) Grand Rapids Griffins vs. (8) Wilkes-Barre/Scranton Penguins

(2) Houston Aeros vs. (7) Milwaukee Admirals

(3) Norfolk Admirals vs. (6) San Antonio Rampage

(4) Chicago Wolves vs. (5) Hershey Bears

Conference semifinals

Eastern Conference

(1) Hamilton Bulldogs vs. (9) Manitoba Moose

(3) Binghamton Senators vs. (5) Bridgeport Sound Tigers

Western Conference

(1) Grand Rapids Griffins vs. (4) Chicago Wolves

(2) Houston Aeros vs. (3) Norfolk Admirals

Conference finals

Eastern Conference

(1) Hamilton Bulldogs vs. (3) Binghamton Senators

Western Conference

(1) Grand Rapids Griffins vs. (2) Houston Aeros

Calder Cup Final

(E1) Hamilton Bulldogs vs. (W2) Houston Aeros

See also
2002–03 AHL season
List of AHL seasons

References

Calder Cup playoffs
Calder Cup